Daray Daray Naina (or spelled as Dare Dare Naina) is a 2012 Pakistani drama serial broadcasting on A-Plus Entertainment every Tuesday. Serial is written by K Rehman and directed by Dilawar Malik, starring Babar Ali, Sami Khan, Neelam Munir, Mehmood Aslam, Zhalay Sarhadi and Shahood Alvi. It was first aired on 6 November 2012.

Cast 
 Sami Khan as Razim
 Babar Ali
 Neelam Munir
 Mehmood Aslam
 Zhalay Sarhadi
 Shahood Alvi
 Taifoor Khan
 Anita Kampher
 Sataish Khan
 Imran Ashraf

References

External links 
 Official website of the serial
 

2012 Pakistani television series debuts
Pakistani drama television series
Urdu-language television shows
A-Plus TV original programming